Kowloon West Cluster is the largest among all seven hospital clusters managed by Hospital Authority in Hong Kong. It consists of five public hospitals and 16 general outpatient clinics  to provide public healthcare services for the population of Wong Tai Sin, Mong Kok, Sham Shui Po, Kwai Tsing, Tsuen Wan and North Lantau. In mid-2012, the population was 1,887,600. The current Cluster Chief Executive is Dr Doris Tse Man-wah.

Services
Kowloon West Cluster operates the following five hospitals of various capabilities to provide a range of acute, convalescent, rehabilitation, and infirmary inpatient and ambulatory care services to the public in the areas of Wong Tai Sin, Mong Kok, Sham Shui Po, Kwai Tsing, Tsuen Wan and North Lantau. In mid-2012, the population of the areas was 1,887,600.

Caritas Medical Centre
Kwai Chung Hospital
North Lantau Hospital
Princess Margaret Hospital
Yan Chai Hospital

In addition to the specialist outpatient clinics in all the eight hospitals, Kowloon West Cluster operates three other specialist outpatient clinics:

East Kowloon Polyclinic
Ha Kwai Chung Outpatient Clinic
Yau Ma Tei Specialist Clinic Extension

Kowloon West Cluster also operates 16 general outpatient clinics:

Caritas Medical Centre Family Medicine Clinic
Cheung Sha Wan Jockey Club General Outpatient Clinic
East Kowloon General Outpatient Clinic
Ha Kwai Chung General Outpatient Clinic
Kwong Wah Hospital General Outpatient Clinic
Lady Trench General Outpatient Clinic
Li Po Chun General Outpatient Clinic
Mrs Wu York Yu General Outpatient Clinic
Mui Wo General Outpatient Clinic
Nam Shan General Outpatient Clinic
North Kwai Chung General Outpatient Clinic
North Lantau Community Health Centre
Our Lady of Maryknoll Hospital General Outpatient Clinic
Robert Black General Outpatient Clinic
Shek Kip Mei General Outpatient Clinic
South Kwai Chung Jockey Club General Outpatient Clinic
Tai O Jockey Club General Outpatient Clinic
Tsing Yi Cheung Hong General Outpatient Clinic
Tsing Yi Town General Outpatient Clinic
Wang Tau Hom Jockey Club General Outpatient Clinic
West Kowloon General Outpatient Clinic
Wu York Yu General Outpatient Clinic
Yan Chai Hospital General Outpatient Clinic

, the cluster has 6,629 beds, including 4,251 for acute care, 1,298 for convalescent, rehabilitation, infirmary and hospice care, 920 for the mentally ill, and 160 for the mentally handicapped; and served by 14,076 full-time equivalent staff.

References

External links

Hospital Authority